Cepora timnatha is a butterfly in the family Pieridae. It is found in Indonesia.

Subspecies
The following subspecies are recognised:
Cepora timnatha timnatha (northern Sulawesi)
Cepora timnatha sorror Fruhstorfer, 1899 (Sula Islands)
Cepora timnatha filia Fruhstorfer, 1902 (southern Sulawesi)
Cepora timnatha filiola Fruhstorfer, 1899 (Sula Besi)
Cepora timnatha aurulenta Fruhstorfer, 1899 (Bangkai)
Cepora timnatha butona Iwasaki & Yata, 2005 (Buton Island)

References

Pierini
Butterflies described in 1862